Agent X may refer to:

Agent Extensibility Protocol, a standardised framework for extensible Simple Network Management Protocol agents
Agent X (Chuck), the codename for the character Alexei Volkoff (Timothy Dalton) on the TV series Chuck
Agent X (Marvel Comics), a fictional mercenary whose adventures have been published by Marvel Comics
Agent X (1986 video game), a 1986 video game released by Mastertronic
Agent X II: The Mad Prof's Back, a 1987 sequel to this game
Agent X (TV series), a U.S. TV series for TNT starring Sharon Stone

See also

Secret Agent X, a U.S. pulp magazine published by A. A. Wyn, and the name of the main character featured in the magazine
Secret Agent X-9, a comic strip begun by writer Dashiell Hammett and artist Alex Raymond
Secret Agent X-9 (1937 serial), a 1937 Universal movie serial based on this comic strip
Secret Agent X-9 (1945 serial), a 1945 Universal movie serial based on this comic strip